Bond-e Bari may refer to:
 Bond-e Bari (1)
 Bond-e Bari (2)